Gradsko may refer to:
Gradsko, Bulgaria, a small village in south-eastern Bulgaria
Gradsko, North Macedonia, a village in North Macedonia
Gradsko Municipality, a municipality in North Macedonia